Dangerous Moonlight (US: Suicide Squadron) is a 1941 British film, directed by Brian Desmond Hurst and starring Anton Walbrook. Among the costumes, the gowns were designed by Cecil Beaton. The film is best known for its score written by Richard Addinsell, orchestrated by Roy Douglas, which includes the Warsaw Concerto.

Dangerous Moonlight'''s love-story plot, told mainly in flashbacks, revolves around the fictional composer of the Warsaw Concerto, a piano virtuoso and "shell-shocked" combat pilot, who meets an American war correspondent in Warsaw, and later returns from America to join the RAF in England to continue to fight against the Germans and their occupation of Poland.

 Plot 
During the German invasion of Poland, Polish airman and piano virtuoso Stefan Radecki (Anton Walbrook) meets American reporter Carole Peters (Sally Gray). He volunteers to fly a "suicide mission" against Germany, but is not selected. Radecki is among the last to escape Warsaw and months later, in New York, he and Carole meet again, and marry.

In England, Radecki gives a public concert and reveals that he has come back to fight, volunteering to fly as a pilot in a Polish squadron, fighting in the Battle of Britain, even though Carole fears he will be killed. His final mission ends with his self-sacrifice by crashing into a German aircraft. He is badly injured in the crash and suffers from amnesia.

Later, Radecki is in a London hospital, recovering from his injuries. He begins to remember his past, recalling composing the Warsaw Concerto, while the Germans bomb the city, and when he first met his wife. Sitting at the piano, Radecki sees Carole and says, "Carole, it's not safe to go out with you when the moon is so bright", repeating the first words he ever spoke to her.

 Cast 

 Anton Walbrook as Stefan "Steve" Radecki
 Sally Gray as Carole Peters Radecka
 Derrick De Marney as Michael "Mike" Carroll, Radecki's manager 
 Cecil Parker as Specialist 
 Percy Parsons as Bill Peters 
 Kenneth Kent as Andre De Guise, the impresario
 J. H. Roberts as Residing physician 
 Guy Middleton as "Shorty" 
 John Laurie as British commander 
 Frederick Valk as Polish bomber commander 
 O. B. Clarence as Waiter with tray of wine 
 Marian Spencer as Miss Gratton, De Guise's secretary
 Philip Friend as Pete, RAF pilot
 Michael Rennie as Kapulski, Polish pilot

 Production Dangerous Moonlight was produced by the British unit of RKO, which financed it.

Since music was such a key element in the film, Walbrook, who was an accomplished amateur pianist, is seen playing in the film, although the music on the soundtrack is played by the professional pianist Louis Kentner. Kentner's involvement was initially uncredited, as he thought that being seen to be playing film music would not help his career. He changed his mind on seeing the film's success. Aerial scenes were actually filmed in combat and feature the No 74 Squadron (Squadron lettering "ZP") Supermarine Spitfire fighters that flew in the Battle of Britain.

 Reception 
Released initially in the UK as Dangerous Moonlight, it was a box office success in Great Britain, although contemporary reviews were generally unfavourable. The New York Times review described it as principally "a sentimental fable in which the excellent Anton Walbrook, so eloquent as the Hutterite leader in The Invaders, and Sally Gray make a listless and anemic pair of lovers. Derrick De Marney does much better by the roguish character of an Irish daredevil. None of them has lifted the film above the level of a hackneyed fiction."Dangerous Moonlight was a melange of art and warfare, with the best-remembered scenes involving the Warsaw Concerto, composed by Richard Addinsell, one of the most beloved classical pieces that emerged from the period. Walbrook was not pleased with his performance and considered the film his least favourite. When released in the United States, the film was renamed Suicide Squadron in a cut 83 minute version, and distributed by Republic Pictures under lease, although its UK release was through RKO Radio British. Despite relying heavily on its film music, Variety noted that the sound quality was noticeably poor, especially in early scenes, although the aerial sequences, however, were particularly effective.

Among modern appraisals, Leonard Maltin commented that Dangerous Moonlight was an "intelligently presented account of concert pianist who becomes a member of a British fighter squadron during WW2; musical interludes (including Richard Addinsell's well-known Warsaw Concerto) well handled. Look for Michael Rennie in a small role." while a 2016 book on Hurst's films dedicates a section to Dangerous Moonlight.

References
Notes

Citations

Bibliography

 Evans, Alun. Brassey's Guide to War Films. Dulles, Virginia: Potomac Books, 2000. .
 Farmer, James H. Broken Wings: Hollywood's Air Crashes. Missoula, Montana: Pictorial Histories Pub Co., 1984. .
 Parish, James Robert. The Great Combat Pictures: Twentieth-Century Warfare on the Screen. Metuchen, New Jersey: The Scarecrow Press, 1990. .
 Truesdale, David and Allan Esler Smith. Theirs is the Glory: Arnhem, Hurst and Conflict on Film''. Warwick, Warwickshire, UK: Helion & Company, 2016. .

External links 
 
 
 

1941 films
British war drama films
British aviation films
Battle of Britain films
British black-and-white films
RKO Pictures films
Films about classical music and musicians
Films directed by Brian Desmond Hurst
Films scored by Richard Addinsell
1940s war drama films
1941 drama films
1940s English-language films
1940s British films